Mykola Mykolaiovych Chupryna (born 4 June 1962) is a Ukrainian rower who was born in Kyiv.

References 
 
 
 

1962 births
Living people
Ukrainian male rowers
Sportspeople from Kyiv
Rowers at the 1992 Summer Olympics
Rowers at the 1996 Summer Olympics
Olympic rowers of the Unified Team
Olympic rowers of Ukraine
World Rowing Championships medalists for the Soviet Union